South Newbury may refer to:

 South Newbury, New Hampshire, an unincorporated community
 South Newbury, Ohio, an unincorporated community